The long-tailed mountain pigeon has been split into two species:
 Buru mountain pigeon, Gymnophaps mada
 Seram mountain pigeon, Gymnophaps stalkeri